Ditellurium bromide is the inorganic compound with the formula Te2Br. It is one of the few stable lower bromides of tellurium.  Unlike sulfur and selenium, tellurium forms families of polymeric subhalides where the halide/chalcogen ratio is less than 2.

Preparation and properties
Te2Br is a gray solid.  Its structure consists of a chain of Te atoms with Br occupying a doubly bridged site.  It is prepared by heating tellurium with the appropriate stoichiometry of bromine near 215 °C. The corresponding chloride and iodide, Te2Cl and Te2I, are also known.

Other tellurium bromides include the yellow liquid Te2Br2, the orange solid TeBr4, and the greenish-black solid TeBr2. Complexes of the type TeBr2(thiourea)2 are well characterized.

References

Bromides
Nonmetal halides
Tellurium compounds
Chalcohalides